Hicham Kanis (born 16 August 1997) is a professional footballer who plays as a forward for Greek Super League 2 club Panserraikos, on loan from PAOK. Born in Italy, he has represented Morocco at youth level.

Club career
He made his professional debut in the Lega Pro for AlbinoLeffe on 10 October 2015 in a game against Pavia and scored a goal on his debut. On 17 February 2018, Hicham scored a double hat-trick in the opening 36 minutes against Pro Piacenza in a Serie C match, that eventually finished 20–0 to Cuneo.

On 2 September 2019, he signed a 1-year contract with Fano.

After playing for the first half of the 2020–21 season in the Moroccan Botola league, on 22 January 2021 he returned to Italy and signed with Serie C club Pergolettese.

International career
Kanis was born in Italy and is of Moroccan descent. He was a youth international for Morocco.

References

External links
 

1997 births
Living people
People from Vimercate
Footballers from Lombardy
Moroccan footballers
Association football forwards
Morocco youth international footballers
Italian footballers
Italian people of Moroccan descent
Italian sportspeople of African descent
U.C. AlbinoLeffe players
Novara F.C. players
U.S. Catanzaro 1929 players
A.C. Cuneo 1905 players
Alma Juventus Fano 1906 players
U.S. Pergolettese 1932 players
Panserraikos F.C. players
Serie B players
Serie C players
Botola players
Moroccan expatriate footballers
Expatriate footballers in Switzerland
Sportspeople from the Province of Monza e Brianza
Renaissance Club Athletic Zemamra players